Landry Bluff is a rock bluff in the Cumulus Hills, Antarctica, standing just north of the mouth of Logie Glacier where the latter joins Shackleton Glacier. It was named by Advisory Committee on Antarctic Names for Edward J. Landry, a United States Antarctic Research Program meteorologist who wintered at Byrd Station in 1963 and at South Pole Station in 1965.

References

Cliffs of the Ross Dependency
Dufek Coast